Song Yang may refer to:

 Yang Song (born 1989), Chinese trampolinist
 Song Yang (badminton) (born 1965), Australian badminton player